Rajavarothiam Sampanthan (born 5 February 1933) is a Sri Lankan Tamil politician and lawyer who has led the Tamil National Alliance since 2001. He has also been a Member of Parliament since 2001, and previously served as a Member of Parliament from 1977 to 1983 and from 1997 to 2000. He was the Leader of the Opposition from September 2015 to December 2018.

Early life and family
Sampanthan was born 5 February 1933. He is the son of A. Rajavarothiam, Superintendent of Stores at the Gal Oya Project. Sampanthan is related to S. Sivapalan and N. R. Rajavarothiam both of whom were MPs for Trincomalee. He was educated at St. Patrick's College, Jaffna, St. Anne's College, Kurunegala, St. Joseph's College, Trincomalee and St. Sebastian's College, Moratuwa. After school he joined Ceylon Law College, graduating as an attorney at law.

Sampanthan married Leeladevi, daughter of P. K. Rudra. They have two sons (Sanjeevan and Senthuran) and one daughter (Krishanthini).

Career

After qualifying Sampanthan practised law in Trincomalee.

Sampanthan joined the Illankai Tamil Arasu Kachchi's (Federal Party) in 1956. ITAK leader S. J. V. Chelvanayakam offered Sampanthan nomination in 1963 and 1970 but Sampanthan declined.

On 14 May 1972 the ITAK, All Ceylon Tamil Congress (ACTC), Ceylon Workers' Congress, Eelath Thamilar Otrumai Munnani and All Ceylon Tamil Conference formed the Tamil United Front, later renamed Tamil United Liberation Front (TULF). Sampanthan was the TULF's candidate in Trincomalee at the 1977 parliamentary election. He won the election and entered Parliament. Sampanthan and all other TULF MPs boycotted Parliament from the middle of 1983 for a number of reasons: they were under pressure from Sri Lankan Tamil militants not to stay in Parliament beyond their normal six-year term; the Sixth Amendment to the Constitution of Sri Lanka required them to swear an oath unconditionally renouncing support for a separate state; and the Black July riots in which up to 3,000 Tamils were killed by Sinhalese mobs. After three months of absence, Sampanthan forfeited his seat in Parliament on 7 September 1983. Sampanthan served as joint treasurer, vice president and general secretary of TULF.

Sampanthan was one of the ENDLF/EPRLF/TELO/TULF alliance's candidates in Trincomalee District at the 1989 parliamentary election but the alliance failed to win any seats in the district. He was one of the TULF's candidates in Trincomalee District at the 1994 parliamentary election but failed to get re-elected after coming second amongst the TULF candidates. However, he re-entered Parliament in 1997 following the assassination of A. Thangathurai on 5 July 1997. He was one of the TULF's candidates in Trincomalee District at the 2000 parliamentary election but the TULF failed to win any seats in the district.

On 20 October 2001 the ACTC, Eelam People's Revolutionary Liberation Front, Tamil Eelam Liberation Organization and TULF formed the Tamil National Alliance (TNA). Sampanthan became the leader of the TNA. Sampanthan contested the 2001 parliamentary election as one of the TNA's candidates in Trincomalee District. He was elected and re-entered Parliament.

Soon after its formation the TNA began to make a more pro-Tamil Tiger stance, recognising the Tigers as the sole representative of the Sri Lankan Tamils. This caused a split within the TULF. Some members of the TULF, led by its president V. Anandasangaree, were opposed to the Tigers. Anandasangaree refused to allow the TNA to use the TULF name during the 2004 parliamentary election. This caused the members of TULF who wished to remain with the TNA, led by Sampanthan, to resurrect the Illankai Tamil Arasu Kachchi political party. Sampanthan became the leader of ITAK.

Sampanthan was re-elected in the 2004, 2010 and 2015 parliamentary elections. The Speaker of the Parliament recognised Sampanthan as Leader of the Opposition on 3 September 2015. During the 2015 Sri Lankan presidential election, the TNA, under his leadership, decided to back Maithripala Sirisena as the common opposition candidate. Sirisena went on to win the election and became the president replacing the incumbent Mahinda Rajapaksa.

Electoral history

Further reading

References

External links

1933 births
Alumni of Ceylon Law College
Alumni of St. Anne's College, Kurunegala
Alumni of St. Joseph's College, Trincomalee
Alumni of St. Patrick's College, Jaffna
Alumni of St. Sebastian's College, Moratuwa
Illankai Tamil Arasu Kachchi politicians
Leaders of the Opposition (Sri Lanka)
Living people
Members of the 8th Parliament of Sri Lanka
Members of the 10th Parliament of Sri Lanka
Members of the 12th Parliament of Sri Lanka
Members of the 13th Parliament of Sri Lanka
Members of the 14th Parliament of Sri Lanka
Members of the 15th Parliament of Sri Lanka
Members of the 16th Parliament of Sri Lanka
People from Trincomalee
People from British Ceylon
Sri Lankan Hindus
Sri Lankan Tamil lawyers
Sri Lankan Tamil politicians
Tamil National Alliance politicians
Tamil United Liberation Front politicians